Ascani is a surname. Notable people with the surname include:

Francesco Ascani (born 1952), Italian racing driver
Anna Ascani (born 1987), Italian politician
Fred Ascani (1917–2010), American aviator and United States Air Force general
Luca Ascani (born 1983), Italian cyclist
Pellegrino Ascani, Italian Renaissance painter

Italian-language surnames